Willes is a surname. Notable people with the surname include:

Christiana Willes (1786-1873), English cricketer, sister of John
Christine Willes, Canadian television, theatre and film actress
Edmund Willes (1832–1896), English cricketer
Edward Willes (priest) (1693–1773), Anglican Bishop of St David's, Bishop of Bath and Wells, prominent cryptanalyst
Edward Willes (1702–1768), English-born judge who became Chief Baron of the Irish Exchequer
Edward Willes (1723–1787), MP for Old Sarum, Aylesbury and Leominster, Solicitor-General 1766, judge of the Court of King's Bench
George Willes (1823–1901), Royal Navy officer
George Willes (cricketer) (1844–1901), English clergyman and cricketer
George Atkinson-Willes (1847–1921), Royal Navy officer
Jabez Willes (1790–1842), New York politician
James Shaw Willes (1814–1872), English judge
Jean Willes (1923–1989), American film actress
John Willes (disambiguation), several people
John Willes (cricketer) (1778–1852), English cricketer
John Willes (judge) (1685–1761), English lawyer and judge
John Willes (1721–1784), MP for Banbury 1746–1754
Mark H. Willes (born 1941), Mormon businessman
William S. S. Willes (1819–1871), Mormon pioneer

See also
Bertram Willes Dayrell Brooke (1876–1965)
Willes Little Flower School, a college in Bangladesh
Willis (disambiguation)
Wills (disambiguation)
Wiles (disambiguation)